TMNT is an action  video game featuring the Teenage Mutant Ninja Turtles. It was developed by Ubisoft Montreal and published by Ubisoft for Xbox 360, Wii, PlayStation 2, GameCube, Nintendo DS, and PlayStation Portable, as well as for Microsoft Windows on March 20, 2007. It is based on the 2007 film of the same name. Versions of the game for the original Xbox and PlayStation 3 were also planned but cancelled.

Gameplay

The gameplay in TMNT contains many acrobatic segments in the vein of another Ubisoft game series, Prince of Persia. The game features 16 story levels and 16 unlockable challenge levels. The game also features four playable characters, each with their own unique fighting style and abilities. The game encourages cooperative gameplay, as the player will have to use each turtle's special abilities to navigate through their environment.

PSP and DS versions
Like their console counterparts, the PSP and DS versions of the game are relatively similar to each other, though each in different ways makes use of the individual system's strengths. Both are based on the same story layout as the console versions, and brings the action to the rooftops in New York in a fast-paced acrobatic platformer. The fighting is simplified and less frequent than what is found in the console versions.

Development
Ubisoft secured the rights from Konami, who had produced all the previous TMNT games. The game's creative director Nick Harper said "The TMNT movie is all about the emotions associated with family and teenage angst. We've taken that philosophy and turned it into gameplay mechanics that will be fun and challenging." Ubisoft has stated the focus within the game is "on the four turtle brothers finding out their differences and getting through family problems".

Reception

TMNT received mixed reviews with many critics praising its action platforming, while criticism went to its repetitive combat, bad camera, and lack of multiplayer. IGN gave the GameCube, Xbox 360, PlayStation 2, and PC versions a 6.0 out of 10, saying that the game is "Strictly for the kids". The Wii version was criticized for using very little of the Wii Remote's unique capabilities, since one can only move the remote back and forth to use the turtles' weapons, with the weapons lacking free-direction attacks. When reviewing the Nintendo DS and Wii versions of TMNT, the UK Official Nintendo Magazine commonly compared the two games to the 1989 arcade game of the same name, and even said in a hint guide that "Turtles games were once better". Nintendo Power gave it 5/10, saying "The real shame is that TMNT once had a legacy of good video games-recent titles such as this one have sent that history to the sewers."

As of April 26, 2007, TMNT has sold 1.1 million copies across eight platforms. For the PlayStation 2, it was re-released as part of the "Greatest Hits" label.

See also
 TMNT (Game Boy Advance)

References

External links
 
 TMNT at MobyGames
 TMNT (DS, PSP) at MobyGames

2007 video games
3D platform games
Cancelled PlayStation 3 games
Cancelled Xbox games
Jade (game engine) games
Nintendo DS games
GameCube games
PlayStation 2 games
PlayStation Portable games
Video games based on Teenage Mutant Ninja Turtles
Ubisoft games
Video games based on films
Video games based on adaptations
Video games scored by Cris Velasco
Video games scored by Jake Kaufman
Video games scored by Sascha Dikiciyan
Video games set in New York City
Video games set in North America
Video games developed in Canada
Wii games
Windows games
Xbox 360 games
Teenage Mutant Ninja Turtles (1990 film series)